Mefjordvær Chapel is a chapel of the Church of Norway in Senja Municipality in Troms og Finnmark county, Norway.  It is located in the village of Mefjordvær on the northern coast of the island of Senja.  It is an annex chapel for the Berg parish which is part of the Senja prosti (deanery) in the Diocese of Nord-Hålogaland.  The white, wooden chapel was built in a long church style in 1916 using plans drawn up by the architect Ludvig Lorentzen.  The chapel seats about 120 people.

History
The earliest existing historical records of the church date back to the year 1589, but the church was not new that year. In 1641, the church was described as "newly improved", meaning the building must have been renovated or newly built. Over 100 years later, in 1753 the church was described as being dilapidated. By 1760, the church had been torn down and replaced with a new church on the same site. The new church was a timber-framed long church with no tower or sacristy. It had an entry porch and a sod roof. In 1809, the church was closed down and its furniture moved to the nearby Berg Church. The old church was still standing vacant in 1818 and looking quite run down. Eventually, the old church was torn down.

See also
List of churches in Nord-Hålogaland

References

Senja
Churches in Troms
Wooden churches in Norway
20th-century Church of Norway church buildings
Churches completed in 1916
15th-century establishments in Norway
Long churches in Norway